Eugenio Bergamasco (1858–1940) was an Italian engineer and politician. Being a member of the Reformist Socialist Party he held different cabinet posts.

Early life and education
Bergamasco was born in Vercelli, Novara, on 15 April 1858. He was a graduate of the Higher Technical Institute in Milan and received a bachelor's degree in civil engineering.

Career
Bergamasco founded the Lomellina Agricultural Cooperative Bank in 1894 which he also headed. In 1898 he established the Lomellina Agricultural Consortium and served as its president. He was the president of the Provincial Council of Pavia in 1908 Then he served as the mayor of Candia Lomellina. Between 1900 and 1909 he was a member of the Parliament. In November 1913 he was elected to the Senate from the Liberal Democrats and served there for three terms. He then joined the Democratic Union of which he was elected vice-president.

Bergamasco was the state secretary at the Ministry of the Navy in the Luzatti cabinet between 2 April 1910 and 29 March 1911 and in the Giolitti cabinet between 30 March 1911 and 24 November 1913. He was appointed minister of the navy on 4 July 1921 to the cabinet led by Prime Minister Francesco Saverio Nitti. Bergamasco tenure ended on 26 February 1922.

Personal life and death
Bergamasco was married and had four sons. He died in Milan on 11 June 1940.

Honours
Bergamasco was the recipient of the following: Commander of the Order of the Crown of Italy (4 April 1909);
Grand Officer of the Order of the Crown of Italy (25 June 1911); Grand Cordon of the Order of the Crown of Italy (27 June 1913); Commander of the Order of Saints Maurice and Lazarus (7 July 1910); Grand officer of the Order of Saints Maurice and Lazarus (1912) and Grand cordon of the Order of Saints Maurice and Lazarus (5 January 1922).

References

External links

1858 births
1940 deaths
Government ministers of Italy
19th-century Italian engineers
20th-century Italian engineers
Italian civil engineers
People from Vercelli
Mayors of places in Italy
Grand Officers of the Order of Saints Maurice and Lazarus
Italian Reformist Socialist Party politicians
Members of the Senate of the Kingdom of Italy